Picciano is a village and comune in Italy in the Province of Pescara, within the Abruzzo region.  Its population at the end of 2006 was 1,398.

History
Picciano is first mentioned in 1049 when Bernardo Earl of Penne, with the Charta Offersionis, gave fields and buildings to build a Benedictine abbey in its hills. This is the first indication of the existence of a town called Picciano. and could be considered its terminus ante quem.

Many legends are known about the origin of the name "Picciano", the most believable talks about shepherds devoted to the Goddess Pithia; other variants of the name, found in the Charta Convenientiae, is "Piczano" so that perhaps the name of the town can be dated back to the Early Middle Age, avoiding conjectures about Roman origins.

Images

Cities and towns in Abruzzo